The following is a list of Irish clans. Main data given are:
 Clan name (Tuath), otherwise Branch name
 Progenitor
 Hereditary Chief or Clan chief
 Septs (finte)
 Location - county, barony or townland, otherwise Location for dynasties' kingdoms
 Cinéal (Kinship), otherwise Cinéal (Parenté)(Kinship) for Mac Dhuibhinse
 Branches, otherwise Clans
 Extra information

Arda Midhair 
 Clan name (Tuath): Arda Midhair
 Progenitor: Lugdach m. Sétnai mic Fergus m. Conaill Gulban m. Néill Noígiallaig
 Hereditary Chief or Clan chief: Ó Dochartaigh (O'Doherty)
 Septs (finte): Mac Giolla Brighdhe (MacBRIDE, GILBRIDE, KILBRIDE, MUCKLEBREED), Mac Eachmharcaigh (MacCAFFERTY MacCAFFERKY, MacCAVERTY), Mac Daibhí (MacDAVITT, MacDADE, MacDAID, MacDEVITT).
 Location - county, barony or townland: Inishowen, Co. Donegal
 Cinéal (Kinship): Cenél Conaill

Beann Traidhe 
 Clan name (Tuath): Beann Traidhe
 Progenitor: Cillíne m. Dochartaich m. Eóin m. Feromuin m. Aildíne m. Oirenn m. Mágach m. Cellaich Croto m. Nechta m. Lugna m. Inomuin m. Benta a quo Bentraige nominantur nó Benta filius Conchobuir m. Nessa ut alii dicunt m. Máil m. Formáil m. Sírnae m. Forich m. Rochada m. Clothnai m. Coirbb m. Sethrann m. Loga m. Cethnenn.
 Hereditary Chief or Clan chief: Ó Coigligh (O'Coskry, COGLEY, KEGLEY) Clann Cosgraigh (O'Coskry, Cosgry, Coskerry, Cosgrave)
 Septs (finte): Ó Beice (BECK, BEAKY, BAKEY), Ó Bogaigh (BUGGY BUGGEY, BOGGY), Ó Cluainaigh (CLOONEY, CLONEY)
 Cinéal (Kinship): Cruithin

Cairrge Brachaidhe 
 Clan name (Tuath): Cairrge Brachaidhe
 Progenitor: Brachaidi Mac Diarmada
 Hereditary Chief or Clan chief: Ua Maol Fhábhaill (Mulfaal, Mulfavil, MacFael, Mulfoyle or Mac Paul)
 Septs (finte): Carrichbrack (Carrickbraghy) in the barony of Inishowen West, County Donegal.
 Cinéal (Kinship): Cenél nEógain

Cenel mBecce 
 Clan name (Tuath): Cenel mBecce
 Progenitor: Suibni (a quo Cenel mBece) mc. Mailodrain mc. Suibne mc. Bec mc. Cuanach mc. Dairi mc. Feidhlimidh mc. Echin mc. Fiacrach Tort mc. Echach mc. Colla Uais
 Location - county, barony or townland:
 Cinéal (Kinship): Síl Colla Uais

Cenél Fergusa 
 Clan name (Tuath): Cenél Fergusa
 Progenitor: Fergusa m. Éogain m. Néill Noígiallaig
 Hereditary Chief or Clan chief: Ua hÓgáin ('O'Hagan')
 Septs (finte): O'Quinns, Ua Mael Fhabaill (Mulfoyle, et al.) and O'Mallons (O'Mellans)
 Location - county, barony or townland: Dungannon (Upper)
 Cinéal (Kinship): Cenél nEógain

Cenél Aonghusa 
 Clan name (Tuath): Cenél Aonghusa
 Progenitor: According to the O Clery Book of Genealogies, M. 790, lines 714 to 718 (Linea Antiqua, Royal Irish Academy MS 23D17, circa 1642), Eógan mac Niall's sons first conquered and held territory in the Bredach in Inishowen. They are enumerated in the following manner:
It e annso tellaighe na Bredchha

714. O Fheidlimid, cedus, muinter Ruarcan et muinter Treallan et muinter Slebhin et muinter Muirdelbaigh et clann Cumuscaigh et clann Narchon c: teallach Tuathail et clann Forcheirnn.

715. O Corbmac, uero, muinter Chele, ocus clann Minghoile, ocus clann Cerdan, ocus .h. Mail, et .h. Ultain et .h. Ruaigne.

716. O Dallan, .h. Eircinn, ocus .h. Cuiliun et .h. Reodan, .h. Ceallaigh, .h. Meran, ocus clann Cuan.

717. O Oilill, muinter Forceallaigh et muinter Mail raifthi, ocus .h. Rosaigh et .h. Gillagan, .h. Donnan, .h. Corpmaic, ocus sil meic Gluais, .h. Follamain, .h. Minain, .h. Uidir, .h. Fercumais,.h. Galan, .h. Donnugan uel .h. Branugan, .h. Ceallaigh, .h. Duibne et clann Filgaile.

718. O Oenghus, .h. Mail phoil, ocus .h. Brolaigh et cenel Oenghusa tulcha og (.i. mic Aini et mic Ecruiti). Et asd e an t-Aenghus sin do-choidh in echtra co righ Temra co nderna a muinerus fris, ocus cor fer comlann tar a chenn .i. cath mullaig Fedha et ba coimdith don chath, ocus d'Aenghus cor gair a cu .i. guan ar na cengal do chloich an atha co tainic ba guth an tigerna an cu .i. goan co ro-muigh an cath iertain co tucadh crich imdha, ocus erannus do, cor dhedhail da seacht macaib iertain; mac do, Echrach o tait clann Aenghusa eachrach i nn-ibh Uais breagh; mac ele do a crich fer Cul re Tulen atuaidh o ta clann Aenghusa cul et alii multi.

 Location - county, barony or townland: County Tyrone
 Cinéal (Kinship): Cenél nEógain

Cenél Mic Earca 
 Clan name (Tuath): Cenél Mic Earca
 Progenitor: Máel Fithrich m. Áeda Uaridnaich m. Domnaill m. Muircherdaich mac Earca m. Muiredaich m. Éogain
 Location - county, barony or townland: Barony of Clogher, County Tyrone
 Cinéal (Kinship): Cenél nEógain

Cenél Luighdech (also Sil Lugdach) 
 Clan name (Tuath): Cenél Luighdech (also Sil Lugdach)
 Progenitor: Lugdach m. Sétnai mic Fergus m. Conaill Gulban m. Néill Noígiallaig
 Hereditary Chief or Clan chief: Ó Domhnaill (O'Donnell)
 Septs (finte): Uí Baoighill (O'Boyles) and the Uí Dochartaigh (O'Dohertys, chiefs of Arda Midhair or Ardmire, perhaps the Finn Valley) Ua Cairbre, Ó Duibhne (DEENY DEANY, DEENEY, DENNY, PEOPLES), Ó Daighre (DEERY, DARRY, DERRY), Mac Dailredochar (DOCKERY DOCKREY, DOCKRY), Ó Dunáin (DOONAN DONAYNE, DONNAN), Ó Dubhthach (Doohey), Ó Glacáin (Glacken), Mac Reannacháin (GRANAHAN, CRENAHAN, CRENAGHAN), Ó hEarghaile (HARLEY HARREL, HARRILY, HERAL), Ó hEigneacháin (HENEGAN HANAGHAN, HANNIGAN), Ó hOireachtaigh (HERAGHTY, ERACHTY, ERRARTY), Mac Meanman (MacMENAMIN, MacMENAM, MacMENAMY), Mac Maongail (MacMONAGLE, MONEYGAL, McGonigal), Ó Coigligh (QUIGLEY, QUIGLY, COGLEY, KEGLEY, TWIGLEY, QUIGG), Mac Robhartaigh (Roarty), Ó Robharcháin (ROWAN, RAGHAN, ROANE, ROHAN, ROUGHAN), Ó Scannail (SCANNELL, SCANLAN), Ó Toráin (TARRANT, TORAN, TORRENS), Mac Muircheartaigh (BREARTY, MacBREARTIE, MacMURTY), Mac Giolla Comhghaill (COYLE COWLE, MacILHOYLE, MULCOYLE), Ó Cromlaoich (CRUMLEY CROMLEY, CRUMLISH, CRUMMELL).
 Location - county, barony or townland: Northern County Donegal
 Cinéal (Kinship): Cenél Conaill
 Branches: Clann Dálaigh (Ua Domhnaill), Clann Chindfaoladh (Ua Baoighill), Arda Midhair

Cenél mBógaine 
 Clan name (Tuath): Cenél mBógaine
 Progenitor: Énnae Bóguine m. Conaill Gulban m. Néill Noígiallaig
 Location - county, barony or townland: Tír Boghaine (barony of Banagh, and part of the barony of Boylagh, in County Donegal).
 Cinéal (Kinship): Cenél Conaill

Cenél Aedha 
 Clan name (Tuath): Cenél Aedha
 Progenitor: Aedha m. Ainmirech m. Setna m. Ferghusa cennfhoda m. Conaill Gulban m. Néill Noígiallaig
 Hereditary Chief or Clan chief: Ó Maeldoraidh, Ó Canannáin (O'Cannon)
 Septs (finte): Ó Gallchobhair (O'Gallagher)
 Location - county, barony or townland: Barony of Tirhugh, alias Tír Aedha, in county Donegal
 Cinéal (Kinship): Cenél Conaill

Cenél Duach 
 Clan name (Tuath): Cenél Duach
 Progenitor: Tigernach Duí (Duach), son of Conall Gulban.
 Hereditary Chief or Clan chief:
 Septs (finte):
 Location - county, barony or townland:
 Cinéal (Kinship): Cenél Conaill

Cenél mBinnigh 
 Clan name (Tuath): Cenél mBinnigh
 Progenitor: Eochach Binnich m. Éogain m. Néill Noígiallaig
 Hereditary Chief or Clan chief: Ua hAghmaill (O'Hamill), Teallach Duibhbrailbe
 Septs (finte): Ua Brolaigh, herenaghs of Tech na Coimairce and Clonleigh
 Location - county, barony or townland: Glenconkeine, barony of Loughinsholin
 Cinéal (Kinship): Cenél nEógain
 Branches: *Cenél mBinnig Glinne *Cenél mBindigh Locha Droichid (east of Magh Ith in Tirone) *Cenél mBindigh Tuaithe Rois (east of the Foyle) and one branch of the Ua Brolaigh

Cenél Moan 
 Clan name (Tuath): Cenél Moan
 Progenitor: Maein m. Muireadaigh m. Éogain m. Néill Noígiallaig
 Hereditary Chief or Clan chief: Ó Gairmleadhaigh (O'Gormley)
 Septs (finte): O Duineachaidh, Ó Croidheáin (O Crean), Ó Lúinigh (O Lunny or O'Loony), O'Tierney (Ó Tiarnaigh), O'Kelly (Ó Ceallaigh), O'Cernaghan (Ó Cearnacháin), O'Garvey (Ó Gairbhith), MacDonaghy (Mac Donncha), Mac Cosgraigh (McCusker,McCosker), Mac Conallaidh (McNally) and Ó Peatáin (O'Patton or Peyton).
 Location - county, barony or townland: Magh Itha in the barony of Raphoe, County Donegal
 Cinéal (Kinship): Cenél nEógain

Cenél Fearadhaigh 
 Clan name (Tuath): Cenél Fearadhaigh
 Progenitor: Feradaich m. Éogain m. Néill Noígiallaig
 Hereditary Chief or Clan chief: Mac Cathmhaoil (McCawell, McCaul, Caulfield etc.)
 Septs (finte): Mag Uidhrín (McGivern), McGirr, Ó Brolacháin (O'Brallaghan, Brollaghan, Bradley), Mac Giolla Mhártáin (Gilmartin, Martin), Maolgeimridh (Mulgemery, Montgomery), Mac Máirtain,  O'Maolpádraig (Mulpatrick, Kilpatrick), Ó Fearadhaigh, (Farady, Ferry), Mac an tSaoir (McIntyre, McAteer), McGilbride.
 Location - county, barony or townland: Clogher, County Tyrone
 Cinéal (Kinship): Cenél nEógain
 Branches: Mac Fiachra sept (MacKeaghery)

Cenél Eanna 
 Clan name (Tuath): Cenél Eanna
 Progenitor: Eanna (Enda), the sixth son of Conall Gulban
 Septs (finte): Hanna, Hainey, Haney, Heaney (O'hEighnigh) (Ó hAnnaidh)
 Location - county, barony or townland: Kings of Magh Ith, Tir Eanna and Fanad in present-day County Donegal.
 Cinéal (Kinship): Cenél Conaill

Cenél Endai 
 Clan name (Tuath): Cenél Endai
 Progenitor: Enda, the youngest son of Niall of the Nine Hostages
 Hereditary Chief or Clan chief: ua Lapáin (O'Lappin, Delap) and Aa h-Eicnechan (roughly O'Heneghan)
 Septs (finte): Ua Bresleáin (O'Breslen or Breslin)
 Location - county, barony or townland: the river Errity to Barnesmore, barony of Tir Hugh, to Sruell in the barony of Banagh, County Donegal. Parish of Aughnis, barony of Kilmacrenan.
 Cinéal (Kinship): Uíbh Néill a' Tuaisceart
 Branches: O'Breslin, chiefs in Fanad

Cenél Cairpri [Mor] 
 Clan name (Tuath): Cenél Cairpri [Mor]
 Progenitor: Cairbre, son of Niall of the Nine Hostages
 Hereditary Chief or Clan chief: Ó Maolchloiche (O'Mulclohy), a name which was later mistranslated to Stone
 Septs (finte): Ua Bresleáin (O'Breslen or Breslin)
 Location - county, barony or townland: "Críoch Cairpre Droma Cliab" of northern County Sligo and northeast County Leitrim. Barony of Carbury in North Sligo.
 Cinéal (Kinship): Uíbh Néill a' Tuaisceart
 Branches: O'Breslin, chiefs in Fanad, Uí Cairpri Laigen (Ua Chiardha or O'Keary, O'Carey), Cairpre Gabra (Ó Ronáin, O'Ronan)

Cenél Tigernaich 
 Clan name (Tuath): Cenél Tigernaich
 Progenitor: Tighearnach m. Muireadaigh m. Éogain m. Néill Noígiallaig
 Hereditary Chief or Clan chief: Ó Maolfothartaigh (O'Mulfoharty), and Ó hEodhasa (O'Hosey)
 Location - county, barony or townland: County Tyrone
 Cinéal (Kinship): Cenél nEógain

Cinel Uchae 
 Clan name (Tuath): Cinel Uchae
 Hereditary Chief or Clan chief:
 Septs (finte): Ó Coscrach (COSGRAVE, COSGROVE, COSKRY, CUSKER,), Ó Beaghain (BEHAN, BEAGHAN, BEAN, BEEGAN, BEGGANE, BEHANE, BIGANE, BIGGANE, BIGGINS, LITTLE), Ó Cobthach (COFFEY COFFEE, COFFIE, COFFY, COWEY, COWHEY, COWHIG), Mac Fhogartach (GOGARTY, GOGERTY, GOGGARTY)
 Location - county, barony or townland: Baronies of Ikeathy and Oughterany in northern Co. Kildare (Cenel n-Ucha and Uachtar Fine, respectively). Crích na Cétach: baronies of Warrenstown, co. Offaly and neighboring Upper Moyfenrath, co. Meath.
 Cinéal (Kinship): Dál Niad Cuirp
 Branches: Uí Fithcellaigh, Uí Maili Derir, Uí Bóetain, Uí Broscai and Uí Folaing., Uí Mainchin of Tír Cenél nUcha (Clann Manchine at the Liffey)

Clan Conchobhair 
 Clan name (Tuath): Clan Conchobhair
 Progenitor: Conchobhar m. Fearghaile m. Maol Dúin m. Maol Fithrich m. Aodha Uairidnaigh
 Hereditary Chief or Clan chief: Ó Cathain (O'Kane, Ó'Cahan)
 Septs (finte): O'Maoláin (O'or McMullan), Mac Bloscaidh (MacCloskey)
 Location - county, barony or townland: lords of Creeve (Coleraine area, County Londonderry) and Keenaght
 Cinéal (Kinship): Cenél nEógain
 Branches: Clan Drugain

Cinel Crimthann 
 Clan name (Tuath): Cinel Crimthann
 Hereditary Chief or Clan chief: Ó Duibh (DUFF, DUFFY)
 Septs (finte): Ó Dubhuidhe (Deevy or Devoy), Ó hIndreadhain (HOURIHAN)
 Location - county, barony or townland: Ballyduff, Stradbally, Co. Laois. Lord of Creamhthainn (i.e. Maryborough)
 Cinéal (Kinship): Laeghis
 Branches: Ui Crimthainn Áin (O'Devoy)

Clann Lugainn 
 Clan name (Tuath): Clann Lugainn
 Progenitor: Lugain, son of Irgalach, son of Eignich, son of Cormac, son of Fergus, son of Aed, son of Cormac, son of Cairpre Dam Argait. Daim Argait (Corpri) son of Echach son of Cremthaind Leith son of Feicc son of Dega Duirn son of Rochatha son of Colla Fochríth
 Hereditary Chief or Clan chief: Mag Uidhir (MAGUIRE, McGUIRE, GUIRE, GUIREY, QUIREY) Meicc h-Uidir
 Septs (finte): Ó hEgneach (HEANY, BIRD, HEENY, HEGNEY, HIGNY), Ó Dubhdhara (DARRAGH, DARRA, DARROUGH, OAKS), Mac Maghnuis (McManus), Mac Gafraidh (MacCaffrey, Godfrey), Mac Gothraidh (MacCORRY MacGORRY, GODFREY, GOHERY, GOFFREY), MacAmhlaimh (MacAuley), Mac Asidha (Cassidy), Mac Gilla Uidhir (MacALEAR, MacELEER), Mac Carmaic (MacCORMACK), Mac Aodh (MacGEE, GEE, MAGEE), Mac Ailghile (LILLY CALILLY, LELY, LILLIE, MacALILLY, MacALYLY), Mac Lochlainn (LOUGHLIN MacLACHLAN), MacMurchadha (MacMORROW, Morrow, Murrow -Clann Aodh), Mac Giolla Iosa (MacALEESE GILEECE, MacLEECE), Mac Con Uladh (MacANALLY, COWLEY, CULLOO), Mac Braoin (BREEN, MacBREEN),
 Location - county, barony or townland: Co. Fermanagh
 Cinéal (Kinship): Síl Daim Argait (Uí Cremthainn)

Clan O'Dwyer 
 Clan name (Tuath): Clan Ó Dubhuir

Clan Drugain 
 Clan name (Tuath): Clan Drugain
 Progenitor:
 Hereditary Chief or Clan chief: Ó Cathain (O'Kane, Ó'Cahan)
 Septs (finte): O'Maoláin (O'or McMullan), Mac Bloscaidh (MacCloskey), Mac Auslain (MacCausland, Scotland), Mac Aibhne (MacEvany, MacAvinney, MacAvinny, MacEvanny), Mac Einrí (Henry), Ó Maoilmheana (Mulvaney, Mulvane, Mulvany), Ó Maoilmhíchíl (Mulmeel), Ó Muireadhaigh (Murray, Morie), Ó Cuaig (Quigg Fivey, Kegg, Quig), Ó Cuinn (Quinn, Quin, Qwin), Ó Tanaidhe (Tanny, Tannay, Tanney, Tannie, Taney), Mac Bháltair (MacWhirter, Scotland).
 Location - county, barony or townland: lords of Creeve (Coleraine area, County Londonderry) and Keenaght
 Cinéal (Kinship): Cenél nEógain

Clan Ceallaigh 
 Clan name (Tuath): Clan Ceallaigh
 Progenitor: Daimine, son of Cairpre Dam Argait
 Hereditary Chief or Clan chief: Mac Domhnaill (MacDONNELL)
 Septs (finte): Ó Flanagain (Flanagan)
 Location - county, barony or townland: Lord of Clankelly, Lisnaskea, Fermanagh
 Cinéal (Kinship): Síl Daim Argait (Uí Cremthainn)

Clan Cuilliaéan 
 Clan name (Tuath): Clan Cuilliaéan
 Progenitor: * Sengann, a king of the Fomorians
 Hereditary Chief or Clan chief: 
 Septs (finte):Collins,Cullen,Cullane,Cullhane,O'Collins
 Location - county, barony or townland: Donegal
 Cinéal (Kinship):

Clann Nadsluaigh 
 Clan name (Tuath): Clann Nadsluaigh
 Progenitor: Nadsluaigh, son of Cairpre Dam Argait, son of Eocho, son of Crimthann Lethan, son of Fiacc, son of Daig Duirn, son of Rochaid, son of Colla Fochríth (da-Chrioch)
 Hereditary Chief or Clan chief: Mac Mathghamna (MacMAHON, MacMAHAN, MAGHAN)
 Septs (finte): Mac Íomhar (MacGiver, KEEVER MacKEEVER, MACEVER, MACKEVER, KEVER), Mac Ardghail (MacARDLE, ARDALL, MacCARDLE, CARDWELL), Mac Bradaigh (Brady), Ó Cearbhail (CARROLL, CAROOL), Mac Pilib (MacPHILLIPS)
 Location - county, barony or townland: Clones, Co. Monaghan
 Cinéal (Kinship): Síl Daim Argait
 Branches: McMahon (MacArtghail, MacIomhar & MacPilib), O'Carroll (Mac Bradaigh).

Clan Diarmatta (also Clandermot) 
 Clan name (Tuath): Clan Diarmatta (also Clandermot)
 Progenitor: Cearallán m. Baoighill m. Diarmada m. Conchobhair m. Fearghaile m. Maol Dúin m. Maol Fithrich m. Aodha Uaridnaich
 Hereditary Chief or Clan chief: Ó Cairealláin, (O'Carolan)
 Septs (finte): Mac Ettigan (Mac Eitigen)
 Location - county, barony or townland: The parish of Clondermot in County Londonderry
 Cinéal (Kinship): Cenél nEógain
 Branches: Tealach Braonáin (Magettigan)

Clann Néill (also Clan Neill) 
 Clan name (Tuath): Clann Néill (also Clan Neill)
 Progenitor: Niall Caille
 Hereditary Chief or Clan chief: Ó Néill Mór (O'Neill)
 Septs (finte): Mac Lochlainn (McLaughlin), Mac Bearáin (Barron), Mac Seáin (McShane or Johnson), Mac Suibhne (MacSweeney, MacSwyn, Swain, Swine), Ó Doibhlín (Devlin Swordbearer to O'Neill), Mac Giolla Easbaig (Gillespie, MacAnaspie, Bishop), Mac Íomhair (MacIver, MacKeever, MacUre, Orr), Mac Ladhmainn (MacClement, Lamond, Lymon, MacLamont or Clements), Mac Conmidhe (MacNamee, MacConamy, MacMeadh, Mee), Mac Néill (Mac Niall), Mac Eoghain (MacKean, MacKeon), The O'Higgins family (of Ballynary)
 Location - county, barony or townland: County Tyrone
 Cinéal (Kinship): Cenél nEógain
 Branches: Uí Néill Ruadh (Ó Néill Mór), Clann Áodh Búidhe.

Clann Domhnaill 
 Clan name (Tuath): Clann Domhnaill
 Progenitor: Domnaill m. Muircherdaich m. Muiredaich m. Éogain m. Néill Noígiallaig
 Hereditary Chief or Clan chief: Ó Donngaile Mór, Chief of Ballydonnelly, Hereditary Marshal of Ulster (O'Donnelly)
 Septs (finte): Ua [Fh]laithbheartaigh (Flaherty, Flaverty, Laverty, Lafferty)
 Location - county, barony or townland: Ballydonnelly, County Tyrone
 Cinéal (Kinship): Cenél nEógain
 Branches:

Clann Fergaile 
 Clan name (Tuath): Clann Fergaile
 Progenitor: Cormac, son of Cairpre Dam Argait
 Hereditary Chief or Clan chief: Ó Baoigheallain (BOYLAN, BOYLAND)
 Septs (finte): Mac Giolla Coisgle (CUSKELLY, CUSKLEY, CUSKERY, MacCUSHELY, QUISKELLY, QUOSKLY),
 Cinéal (Kinship): Síl Daim Argait (Uí Cremthainn)

Clann Colgcan (Clann Cholgaín) 
 Clan name (Tuath): Clann Colgcan (Clann Cholgaín)
 Progenitor: Domnall Úa Óengusa m. Áeda m. Uallacháin m. Taidgc m. Uallacháin m. Taidgc m. Domnaill m. Óengusa m. Cummascaig m. Colgcan m. Mugróin m. Flaind Dá Chongal m. Díumasaich m. Forannáin m. Congaile m. Máel h-Umai m. Cathail [m. Éogain] m. Bruidge m. Nath Í m. Rosa Failgi m. Cathaír Máir.
 Hereditary Chief or Clan chief: Ua hAonghusa (O'Hennessy)
 Septs (finte): Ua hUallachain (O'Holohan or O'Houlihan), Uí Rotaidi, Uí Muricáin, Uí Bróen, Uí Cholgan, Ó Mael Eidigh (MULEADY, MALADY, MALLEW, MELODY, MILEY, MILLEA), Ó Maolagain (MULLIGAN, MILLICAN, MILLIKAN, MILLIKEN), Mac Cochlainn (COLGAN)
 Location - county, barony or townland: Barony of Lower Philipstown, Co. Offaly
 Cinéal (Kinship): Uí Failge
 Branches: O'Hennessy of Gailenga Bec, and of Uí Mac Uais

Clann Chindfaoladh 
 Clan name (Tuath): Clann Chindfaoladh
 Progenitor: Baighill m Bradagain m Muirchertaigh m Cindfhaeladh
 Hereditary Chief or Clan chief: Ua Bhaeighill (O'Boyle)
 Location - county, barony or townland: Tir Ainmireach (around Ardara), Three Tuatha (around Falcarragh and Kilmacrennan) and barony of Boylagh in County Donegal.
 Cinéal (Kinship): Cenél Conaill

Clann Máellugra a.k.a. Cenél Maoilughra, Clanmalier 
 Clan name (Tuath): Clann Máellugra a.k.a. Cenél Maoilughra, Clanmalier
 Progenitor: Flann m. Máel Ruanaid m. Cellaich m. Máel Augra m. Conchobuir m. Áeda m. Tomaltaich m. Flaind m. Díumasaich m. Congaile m. Forannáin m. Congaile m. Máel h-Umai m. Cathail m. Bruidge m. Nath Í m. Rosa Failgi.
 Hereditary Chief or Clan chief: Ua Díomasaigh (Dempsey)
 Septs (finte): Ó Bearghda (BARRY, BEARY), Ó Maoil Eimhin (MULLAVIN MALLAVIN, MacLAVIN, MULLEVANE, MULLEVEN, MULLIVANE, Ó Coinin (CONINE, CUNEEN, KINANE, KINNEEN)
 Location - county, barony or townland: Barony of Upper Philipstown in the King's County and the Barony of Portnahinch in the Queen's County.
 Cinéal (Kinship): Uí Failge

Clann Guaire 
 Clan name (Tuath): Clann Guaire
 Cinéal (Kinship): Uí Ceinnselaig

Clann Fiachu meic Ailella 
 Clan name (Tuath): Clann Fiachu meic Ailella
 Cinéal (Kinship): Uí Ceinnselaig

Dál Birn 
 Branch name: Dál Birn
 Cinéal (Kinship):  Osraige
Clans: Mac Giolla Phádraig (Fitzpatrick), Costigan, Dunphy, O'Brennan

Dal Cairbre Aradh (Dál Coirpri Aradh) Cliach 
 Clan name (Tuath): Dal Cairbre Aradh (Dál Coirpri Aradh) Cliach
 Progenitor: Mál mac Arbhara...Flaithbertach m. Crunnmaíl m. Commáin m. Fínáin m. Fhaigir m. Eirníne m. Féicc m. Meic Ieir m. Gossa m. Fabrich m. Máil m. Ainmerech m. Fir Roith m. Muine m. Fir Neud m. Fir Lugdach m. Buain m. Argatibair m. Cairpre Cluichechair mc Con Corb & Eithne Sithbaicce ingen side Óengusa Múisc
 Septs (finte):  Ó hIarlaith (HERLIHY, HARLEY, HURLEY), Ó Geibhennach (GIVNEY, COVENEY, GEANY, GEVENEY, GIBNEY, GUINAN, GUINEA, KEVENEY), Ó Cathalain (Ó Cadhla (KEILY, KEALY, KEELY, KIELY), Ó Longaidh (LONG, LONGY), Mac Muirnigh (MURNEY, MORNIE, MORNEY), Mac Bearthagra (BERKERY BARAGRY, BARGARY, BARRAGRY, BERACHRY, BERKERRY)
 Location - county, barony or townland: Ara Chliach was centered east of the city of Limerick, perhaps in or near the baronies of Clanwilliam and Coonagh in northeastern county Limerick.
 Cinéal (Kinship): Dál Cairpre Cluichechair
 Branches: Uaithne Cliach, Uí Cuanaigh (MacMuirnigh, Ó Longaidh)

Dal Cairbre Aradh Tíre 
 Clan name (Tuath): Dal Cairbre Aradh Tíre
 Progenitor: Finnchaidh, son of Ferroith...Connaid m. Máeli Doburchon m. Lóchéne m. Demle m. Lommáin m. Cuirc m. Findchada m. h-Írchada m. Fir Roith m. Fir Nuad m. Buain m. Airgetbrain m. Cairpri Cluichechair m. Con Corb unum genus est & Dál Cairpri Arad Tíre.
 Hereditary Chief or Clan chief: Ó Riada (REIDY, REEDY, REDDY, READY -W. Tipp.), Ó Donnagain (DONEGAN, DONNEGAN, DONNEGANE, DOONICAN, DOONIGAN, DUNICAN, DUNNIGAN)
 Septs (finte): Ó Murnain (MURNANE, MARRINANE, MARNANE, WARREN-W. Tipp.), Ó hAinmhireach (HANBERRY, HANNEBERRY, HANBURY, HAMERY, ANSBORO-W. Tipp.), Ó Bodhran (BURRANE, BORAN -W.Tipp), Ó Danchair (DANAHER, DANAGHER), Ó Dubh Dabharc (DURACK, DOORICK -W.Tipp Uaithne Tíre), Ó Loingsigh (LYNCH, LYNCHY, LENCH, LENCHY)
 Location - county, barony or townland: Co. Tipperary (Aradh Tíre was located in northern Tipperary, within the half barony of Ara (and Owney) or the northern half of the barony of Owney and Ara.)
 Cinéal (Kinship): Dál Cairpre Cluichechair
 Branches: Uaithne Tíre

Dál Coirpri Cliach (Dál Coirpri Loingsic Beic) 
 Clan name (Tuath): Dál Coirpri Cliach (Dál Coirpri Loingsic Beic)
 Progenitor: Lughaidh Corb from,..Cairpre Cluichechair mc Con Corb & Eithne Sithbaicce ingen side Óengusa Múisc
 Location - county, barony or townland: Barony of Idrone in Co. Carlow (in Leinster).
 Cinéal (Kinship): Dál Cairpre Cluichechair
 Branches: Dál Coirpri Loingsic

Dál Coirpri Loingsic 
 Clan name (Tuath): Dál Coirpri Loingsic
 Progenitor: Coirpri Musc the poet, who received the land of Tír nAmhais from Aongus Musc. ...Lughaidh Corb from,..Cairpre Cluichechair mc Con Corb & Eithne Sithbaicce ingen side Óengusa Múisc
 Location - county, barony or townland: Munster
 Cinéal (Kinship): Dál Coirpri in Ara Cliach (Dál Coirpri Loingsic Beic)

Dál Cormaic Luisc 
 Clan name (Tuath): Dál Cormaic Luisc
 Progenitor: Corbmaic m. Con Corb (clan of Cormac Losc)
 Location - county, barony or townland: Located in the southernmost barony of County Kildare, that is the barony of Kilkea and Moone.
 Cinéal (Kinship): Laighin
 Branches:  Uí Labrada, Uí Gabla Fini, Uí Gabla Roírenn, Uí Buide, Uí Dega Bic .i. Uí Muiredaig, Uí Chuilind, Uí Labrada Cuthraige .i. Síl Fergusa Cuthig, Uí Chuircc, Uí Librén, Uí Ochrai.

Dál Messin Corb (Ui Meisincorp) 
 Clan name (Tuath): Dál Messin Corb (Ui Meisincorp)
 Progenitor: Mesin Corb mc Con Corbb
 Hereditary Chief or Clan chief: Ua Feghaile (O'Farrelly, Uí Garrchon)
 Location - county, barony or townland: Wicklow mountains, to north of Arklow in county Wicklow. Originally, Liffey plain.
 Cinéal (Kinship): Dál Messin Corb
 Branches: Uí Garrchon, Uí Con Corbb, Uí Con Cainnig, Uí Chúáin, Uí Alténi, Uí Doccomláin, Uí Bróccáin, Uí Garbáin, Uí Chon Galand, Uí Bróccéni, Cenél Ciaráin & Uí Techtaire, Uí Meic Aird Maigne & Uí Moínaig & Uí Conndoith & Uí Feichíne & Uí Cáechtangéni, Uí Noíthig & Uí Follomuin & Uí Forandlo, Uí Dímmae Cirr & Uí Congnaid, Uí Dubchróin & Uí Beraich, Uí Donnáin & Uí Sáráin

Dál n-Oaich 
 Clan name (Tuath): Dál n-Oaich
 Progenitor: Crimthann Oach, son of Fiacc, son of Daig Duirn, son of Rochaid, son of Colla Fochríth
 Location - county, barony or townland:  Co. Fermanagh
 Cinéal (Kinship): Cenél Rochada

Fernmag, or Fer Fernmaighe [Farney] 
 Clan name (Tuath): Fernmag, or Fer Fernmaighe [Farney]
 Progenitor: Lethlobor m. Fogartaig m. Muiredaig m. Laidgnen m. Fogartaig m. Donnacain m. Fogartaig m. Ruadrach m. Mailfothardaig m. Arthraich m. Aithechda m. Mailduib m. Mailfothardaig m. Cronain m. Fergusa m. Nadsluaig m. Daim argait m. Echach m. Cremthaind Leith m. Feicc m. Dega Duirn m. Rochatha m. Colla Fochrich m. Echdach Doimlen.
 Hereditary Chief or Clan chief: Ó Ciaráin (O'Kieran)
 Septs (finte): Uí Chríochain (O'Creehan, CREHAN, CREIGHTON, CRICHTON, Uí Lorcáin, Mac Cuilinn (MacQUILLAN, CULLEN, COLLINS), Ó Donnagan (DONEGAN, DONNEGAN, DONNEGANE), Ó Merligh (MARLEY, MARLIE), Ó Daimhin (DEVINE, DEVANE, DEVIN), Ó Dubhruis (DOORISH, DORISH, DORIS, DOURISH), Ó Feadagain (FEDEGAN FADDIGAN, FEDDIGAN), Ó Callada (KELLEDY KALLADIE, KEELEDIE, KELEEDY), Ó Leanain (Leynan), Ó Luain (ÓLOAN, LOON, LUAN, LAMB), Ó Maoilfhinn (MALINN MALLIN, MALYNN, MILLYNN, MULLIN), Ó Marcaigh (MARKEY MARKAY, RIDER, RYDER), Mac Uaid (MacQUAID MacQUADE), Ó Reannachain (RENEHAN RENAGHAN, RENIGHANE, RONAGHAN), Mac Ruari (RORY MacGRORY, MacRURY), Mac Sceachain (SKEHAN SKEEHAN, THORNTON), Mac Soilligh (SOLLY, SOLLEY, SOLEY, SULLY), Ó Tuathail (Toal), Ó Tomaltach (TUMELTY, TOMALTY), Mac Cuairt (MacCOURT, COURTNEY), Mac Raghiallaigh (CRILLY, CROLY, CROLLY),
 Location - county, barony or townland: Barony of Farney, Co. Monaghan.
 Cinéal (Kinship): Cenél Rochada, Síl Colla Focrích

Fothairt in Chairn a.k.a. Fothar Tíre 
 Clan name (Tuath): Fothairt in Chairn a.k.a. Fothar Tíre
 Progenitor: Sétna, the son of Artt Cerp, son of Cairbre Niad, son of Cormac Már, son of Óengus Mend, son of Eochaid Find Fuath n-Airtt, son of Feidhlimidh Reachtmhar, son of Tuathal Teachtmhar
 Hereditary Chief or Clan chief: Ó Lorcain (LARKIN, LARKAN, LARKEN, LARCOM, LARKING, LERKIN,)
 Location - county, barony or townland: Barony of Forth, Co. Wexford
 Cinéal (Kinship): Fotharta
 Branches: Fothairt Fili, Fothairt Tuile, Fothairt Maige Ítha (7 Aicme (tribes), viz., Ui Deaga, Ui Setna, Ui Dimai, Ui Eircc, Ui Chormaic, Ui Niath and Ui Duirrtheacht), Fothairt Imchlár oc Ard Macha & Fothairt Bile.

Fothairt Feadh a.k.a. Fotharta Osnadhaigh 
 Clan name (Tuath): Fothairt Feadh a.k.a. Fotharta Osnadhaigh
 Progenitor: Dub Indrecht m. Fergusa m. Moínaig m. Fínáin m. Rónáin m. Echach m. Báeth m. Nannida m. Féicc m. Ier m. Cathbath m. Adnaich (a quo Fothairt) m. Airt Chirp m. m. Coirpri Niad, in descent from Cormac Már m. Óengusa Mind m. Eochaid Find Fuath n-Airtt m. Feidelmid Rechtada m. Thuathail Techtmair
 Hereditary Chief or Clan chief: Ó Nuallain (NOLAN, KNOWLAN- Laeghis)
 Septs (finte): Ó Bolguidhir (BOLGER, BULGER), Ó Cobthach (COFFEY, COFFEE, COFFIE), Ó Luinin (Lineen),
 Location - county, barony or townland: Barony of Forth, Co. Carlow
 Cinéal (Kinship): Fotharta
 Branches: Fothairt Airthir Liphi, Fotharta Airbrech fri Brí Ele aniar, and Fotharta Fer Cúl, Fothar Breg; alias Fothar Mac nDeichill of Bregia.

Laeghis 
 Clan name (Tuath): Laeghis
 Progenitor:  Fachtna m. Milige a quo Baccán m. Brain m. Eircc h-Ubulchind m. Feidelmid mc Findchada m. Fiachach Uanchind m. Dáire m. Rossa m. Ogomain m. Fergusa Múlcheist m. Fachtna m. Milige m. Intait m. Lugdach Loíchsi m. Conaill Cernaich.
 Hereditary Chief or Clan chief: Ó Mordha (O'MORE, MOORE)
 Septs (finte): Mac Gaethin (GAHAN, MacGEEHAN, MAGEEHAN), Mac Ceadach (KEADY, KEADIE, KEDDY, KEEDIE, KEEDY, MACKEADY), Ó Leathlobhar (LALOR, LAWLOR), Ó hArraghain (HARRIGAN, HARAGHAN, HARAHAN), Ó Liathain, Mac Laoidhigh (LEE, MacLEA, MacLEE), Ó Suaird (SWORDS SORD, SOURDES, SUARD), Ó Broithe (BROPHY, BROFIE), Ó Casain (CASHIN, KISSANE), Ó Deoradhain (DORAN, DORRIAN), Ó Dunlaing (DOWLING), Ó Duibhgainn (Deegan),
 Location - county, barony or townland: Co. Laois
 Cinéal (Kinship): Laeghis

Mac Craith (McGrath) 
 Clan name (Tuath): McGrath
 Progenitor: Echthighern (brother of Brian Boru)
 Hereditary Chief or Clan chief: Seán Alusdrann Mac Craith (Ulster),
 Septs (finte): Thomond and Ulster
 Location - county, barony or townland: Munster and Ulster

Mac Dhuibhinse 

 Clan name (Tuath): Mac Dhuibhinse
 Septs (finte): Mac D(h)uibhinse
 Septs (finte): Mac Avinch(e)y, MacAvinch(e)y, Macavinchey, Mcavinch(e)y, Mc Avinch(e)y - Translated as derived of Mac D(h)uibhinse
 Septs (finte): Mc Aninch, McIninch, McNinch -  The descendant of Mac D(h)uibhinse (To be confirmed)
 Septs (finte): Vincent - Adopted
 Location - county, barony or townland: Ulster, Counties Armagh, Londonderry, Monaghan, Tyrone
 Cinéal (Parenté)(Kinship): 
 Location - county, barony or townland: Dublin (1600s)
 Cinéal (Parenté)(Kinship): 
 Location - county, barony or townland: Limerick (1600s)
 Cinéal (Parenté)(Kinship):
 Extra: The Son of the man from the black island and/or Son of Black man of the Island and/or Son of the dark man of the island and/or Son of the Black Island
 Extra: "Son D(h)uibhinse", a given name meaning "black island"
 Extra: An alternative, more colloquial nickname might apparently be "The Goat-Like One"
 Extra: Mac Avinchey - Irish / Mac Dhuibhinse - dubh / black - innis / island. A Sept / Family branch, who had their territory in Counties Armagh, Londonderry and Tyrone in the Ulster Province. Also changed to Vincent there.
 Extra: The older record I found is Mcavinchey, Annie

Mac Murchadha 
 Clan name (Tuath): Mac Murchadha
 Progenitor: Murcha or Murchadha
 Hereditary Chief or Clan chief: MacMurchadha (MacMorough, MacMorrow, Morrow, Moroghoe)
 Septs (finte): MacMurcha, MacMurchadha, Ó Murchadha (MORROW, MURROW, MacMORROW, MOROGHOE, MOROGHOW, MORROWSON, MURPHY, MacMURRAY, MacMORAY)
 Location - county, barony or townland: Ulster, Leinster and Scotland
 Cinéal (Kinship): Uí Ceinnselaig
 Branches: Morrow, MacMurrough, MacMurray (MacMoray), Kavanagh, Murphy

Maigh Aoife 
 Clan name (Tuath): Maigh Aoife
 Progenitor: Rosa Failgi m. Cathaír Máir.
 Hereditary Chief or Clan chief:
 Septs (finte):  Ó Moenaigh (MOONEY, MAINEY, MEONA, MOONY), Ó Mughron (MORAN, MORAINE, MORANE, MOREN, MORRIN, MORYNE, MOURANE, MURRAN), Ó Muireagain (MORGAN MORRIGAN, MURCAN, MURGAN, MERRIGAN)
 Location - county, barony or townland: Parsons of Ballymooney, Geasehill, Offaly
 Cinéal (Kinship): Uí Failge

Muintír-Birn 
 Clan name (Tuath): Muintír-Birn
 Progenitor: Birnn m. Ruadrach m. Murchada m. Máel Dúin m. Áeda Alláin
 Hereditary Chief or Clan chief: Mac Ruaidhrí (MacRory, [Mac]Rogers)
 Septs (finte): Mac Murchadha (MacMorrow, Morrow, Murrow, Murphy, MacMurphy, Morrowson)
 Location - county, barony or townland: Strabane (upper)
 Cinéal (Kinship): Cenél nEógain
 Branches: Tellach Ainbhith

Muintir Dalachain 
 Clan name (Tuath): Muintir Dalachain
 Progenitor: Baoighill m Bradagáin m Muirchertaigh m Cindfhaeladh
 Hereditary Chief or Clan chief: Ó Cearnacháin (e.g. Carnaghan, Carnahan, Kernaghan) and Ó Dalachain
 Location - county, barony or townland: Tuath Bladhach (Bladhaigh) anglicized Tuath Doe (now Creeslough & Dunfanaghy), south of Ros-Iorguil (now Downing's & Carrigart) County Donegal
 Cinéal (Kinship): Cenél Conaill

Muintir Pheodachain (or Muintir Feodachain) 
 Clan name (Tuath): Muintir Pheodachain (or Muintir Feodachain)
 Progenitor: Cormac, son of Cairpre Dam Argait
 Hereditary Chief or Clan chief: Mac Giolla Finnein (MacALINION, GILLEEN, GLENDON, LEONARD)
 Location - county, barony or townland:
 Cinéal (Kinship): Síl Daim Argait (Uí Cremthainn)

Muintir Caeman 
 Clan name (Tuath): Muintir Caeman
 Progenitor: Cormac, son of Cairpre Dam Argait
 Cinéal (Kinship): Síl Daim Argait (Uí Cremthainn)

Sil nDaimine 
 Clan name (Tuath): Sil nDaimine
 Progenitor: Daimíne, son of Cairpre Dam Argait, son of Eocho, son of Crimthann Lethan, son of Fiacc, son of Daig Duirn, son of Rochaid, son of Colla Fochríth (da-Chrioch).
 Hereditary Chief or Clan chief: O'Maolruanaidh (Mulrooney)
 Location - county, barony or townland: Co. Fermanagh
 Cinéal (Kinship): Síl Daim Argait, Uí Chremthaind

Síl Tuathail an Tuaiscirt a.k.a. Fir Leamhna 
 Clan name (Tuath): Síl Tuathail an Tuaiscirt a.k.a. Fir Leamhna
 Progenitor: Tuathal, son of Daimíne (a quo Síl Daimini), son of Cairpre Damargait, son of Echach, son of Crimthann, son of Fiacc, son of Daig Duirn, son of Rochaid, son of Colla Fochríth
 Hereditary Chief or Clan chief: Ó Caomhain
 Location - county, barony or townland: Clogher (Clochar mac nDaimin) in modern county Tyrone.
 Cinéal (Kinship): Síl Daim Argait (Uí Cremthainn)

Síl Aedha Eaniagh 
 Clan name (Tuath): Síl Aedha Eaniagh
 Progenitor: Cairbre, son of Niall of the Nine Hostages
 Hereditary Chief or Clan chief: O'Murchada, O'Murphy
 Septs (finte): O'Mellon
 Location - county, barony or townland: Barony of Strabane, County Tyrone.
 Cinéal (Kinship): Uíbh Néill a' Tuaisceart

Sil Chormaic (Clann Cormaic) 
 Clan name (Tuath): Sil Chormaic (Clann Cormaic)
 Progenitor: Cormaicc m. Nath Í m. Crimthaind m. Énnai Ceinselaig
 Hereditary Chief or Clan chief:
 Location - county, barony or townland: River Slaney basin in County Wexford, the MacMurrough royal demesne around Ferns, as well as the barony of Scarawalsh
 Cinéal (Kinship): Uí Ceinnselaig
 Branches: Cuthraighe, Ua Trena, Ui Cruinn or Ui Cuinn, Ua Gabla Fine and Ua Gabla Roireann

Sil Máeluidir 
 Clan name (Tuath): Sil Máeluidir
 Hereditary Chief or Clan chief: Ua hArtghaile (Hartley)
 Septs (finte): Ó Foirtcheirn (FORTUNE, FORTIN), Ó Laidhgnen (LYNAN, LYNAGH, LEEGYAN), (both Ui Deagha), Ó Cuilen (Cullen)
 Location - county, barony or townland: The Baronies of Shelmalier in county Wexford
 Cinéal (Kinship): Uí Ceinnselaig
 Branches: Ui Deagha, Ferann na Cenél

Siol aElaigh 
 Clan name (Tuath): Siol aElaigh
 Hereditary Chief or Clan chief: Ó Gaotháin (GAHAN)
 Septs (finte): Ó Niall, Ó Dúnlaing
 Location - county, barony or townland: South Wicklow & north-east Wexford
 Cinéal (Kinship): Síol Faolcháin, Uí Chionnsealaigh

Síol Faolcháin 
 Clan name (Tuath): Síol Faolcháin
 Progenitor: Éogan Cáech (Síl Mella,), son of Nath Í, and great-grandson of Éana Cionnsealach
 Hereditary Chief or Clan chief: Mac Murchadha sept (MacMurrough, Kinsella), Kavanagh (Mac Murchadha Caomhánach or Ó Caomhánaigh). Current Chief is William Butler Kavanagh (Wales)
 Septs (finte): Ua Finnthighearn (Finneran), Mac Bhadach (VADDOCK, MADDOCK, WADDICK, WADDOCK), Mac Dáibhí Mór (DAVIDSON, DAVIS, DAVYMORE, MacDavie More), Ó Dúnlaing (DOWLING, DOOLAN, DOOLEN, DOWLAN, DUNLANG: Síol Elaigh sept)
 Location - county, barony or townland: South Wicklow & north-east Wexford
 Cinéal (Kinship): Uí Chionnsealaigh
 Branches: Gahan's of Síol Ealaigh (barony of Shillelagh)

Tuath-an-Toraidh 
 Clan name (Tuath): Tuath-an-Toraidh
 Hereditary Chief or Clan chief: Ua Dubhsláine (DELANEY, DELANE, DELANY, DULANE, DULANEY, O'Delany or O'Dulany)
 Location - county, barony or townland: Coill Uachtarach, barony of Upper Woods, Co. Leix
 Cinéal (Kinship): Osraighe

Úa Bresail Airthir [Orior] 
 Clan name (Tuath): Úa Bresail Airthir [Orior]
 Progenitor: Buachalla m. Conchobuir Corraig m. Máel Dúin m. Fíngin m. Rónáin m. Tuathail m. Ailella m. Conaill m. Féicc m. Bressail m. Feidelmid m. Fiachrach Cassáin m. Collai Fochríth.
 Hereditary Chief or Clan chief: Ó Céalecháin (KEALAGHAN, KEALAHAN, KEELAGHAN)
 Septs (finte): Ó Cernachain (KERNAGHAN, KEARNAGHAN), Ó Madadhain (Madigan), Ó Tréinfhir (TRAINOR TRAINER, TRAYNER), Mac Acadain (MacCADDEN, CADIGAN, MacADAM, MacADAN), Ó Caisile (CASSILY CASHEL, CASLEY, CASSELL, CASSELY, CUSHLEY), Ó Dalachain (DULLAHAN, DALLAGHAN, DALLAHAN, DALLAN, DOLOGHAN),
 Location - county, barony or townland: Northern Armagh
 Cinéal (Kinship): Airthir, Síl Fiachra Cassán
 Branches: Clann Fermaighe (Mac Acadain), Muintir Caiseil

Úa Bresail Macha 
 Clan name (Tuath): Úa Bresail Macha
 Progenitor: Cummascaig m. Conchobuir Chorraig m. Mailduin m. Finghin m. Ronain m. Thuathail m. Ailella m. Conaill m. Feicc m. Bressail m. Feidlimthe m. Fiachach m. Colla Fochrich.
 Hereditary Chief or Clan chief: Ó Gairbith (GARVEY)
 Septs (finte): Ó Gabhain (GOAN, SMITH, SMYTH), Ó Cairregain (KERRIGAN, CARRIGAN, CARAGHAN, CARAHAN),
 Location - county, barony or townland: Northern Armagh
 Cinéal (Kinship):  Airthir

Úa Baoighealláin 
 Clan name (Tuath): Úa Baoigheallain
 Progenitor: High King Cairell Colla - Uais, Colla-Erc, Colla-Carthend, Colla-Muredach, Colla-Amalgad, Cairpre Daim Airgit, Prince Daimhin (Davin Colla) Lord of Fermanagh, King Treinor (Trenfher) ua Baigheallain, Aodh Ua Baigheallain, Maol Ruanaidh Baoigheallain
 Hereditary Chief or Clan chief: The Ó Boylan
 Septs (finte): Ó Boylan, Boyuland, Bailen, Baylon, Boilen in Kilcullen, Baylan, in Meath, Bullion USA, Bullen USA, Boylen in Nova Scotia, Boleyn and Bolyn in England, Bedan, Boelan, Boilan, Boilin, Boiling, Boolen, Boulin, Boyan, Boylane,Boylin, Boylon, Boylson, Brylan, Bylanm Bylane, Bylen, Boylin, Boylon. Some Kings, Flannagans and Boylands are Boylan Septs.

-   Note: Ó'Baoighill-Boyle and Ó'Beolláin-Boland are independent Clans of other origins - related perhaps only in case of spelling errors.)

 Location - county, barony or townland: The Kingdom of Dartraige -also spelt n-Dartraighi, Dairtre Dartree, Dartrey, Dartraige Coininnsi, Dairtre,or Dartry (in Oirghialla, Oriel / Airghiall Monaghan Ireland)
 Cinéal (Kinship):  Clan Colla originally from Colchester, England ca. year 87 Christian Era.

Uí Felmeda Thes 
 Clan name (Tuath): Uí Felmeda Thes
 Hereditary Chief or Clan chief: Úa Murchadha or MacMurchadha (O'Murroughe, Murrowe, Morrow, Murrow or Murphy) chiefs of Crioch O'Felme or Hy-Feidhlme [Hy-Felimy]
 Septs (finte): Ó Gairbhain (GARVAN, GIRVAN)
 Location - county, barony or townland: Offelimy, now the barony of Ballaghkeen, in County Wexford. Oulartleigh Castle
 Cinéal (Kinship): Uí Ceinnselaig

Uí Felmeda Tuaidh 
 Clan name (Tuath): Uí Felmeda Tuaidh
 Progenitor: Oilioll mac Muiredaig, alias Ui Onchon
 Hereditary Chief or Clan chief:  O'Garvey
 Location - county, barony or townland: Tulach Ua Felmedha, a.k.a. Tullowphelim, became the namesake for the parish of Tullow. Rathvilly, Co. Carlow
 Cinéal (Kinship): Uí Ceinnselaig

Uí Fergusa 
 Clan name (Tuath): Uí Fergusa
 Location - county, barony or townland:
 Cinéal (Kinship): Uí Ceinnselaig

Uí Briúin Cualand 
 Clan name (Tuath): Uí Briúin Cualand
 Progenitor: Brian, son of Enna Nia, son of Bressal Bélach, son of Fiachu Baicced, son of Cathir Mor
 Hereditary Chief or Clan chief: Ó Coscrach (Cosgrave, or Cosgrove)
 Location - county, barony or townland: Baronies of Ballinacor North and Rathdown, in co. Wick., and the south half of the barony of Rathdown, in co. Dublin.
 Cinéal (Kinship): Dál Niad Cuirp

Uí Muiredaig 
 Clan name (Tuath): Uí Muiredaig
 Progenitor: Descend from Ughaire, a King of Leinster (died 956), Muiredaig m. Murchada m. Bráen (d. 693)
 Hereditary Chief or Clan chief: Ua Tuathail (O'Toole)
 Septs (finte): Ua Lorcáin
 Location - county, barony or townland: The baronies of Kilkea and Moone, Narragh and Reban East and West, and parts of Connell, in co. Kildare, plus the plus west half of Uí Mail, in co. Wicklow.
 Cinéal (Kinship): Uí Dúnlainge

Uí Dúnchada 
 Clan name (Tuath): Uí Dúnchada
 Progenitor: Gillai Mo Cholmóc m. Cellaich m. Dúnchada m. Lorccáin m. Fáeláin m. Muiredaig m. Bróen m. Fáeláin m. Cellaich m. Dúnchada m. Murchada.
 Hereditary Chief or Clan chief: Mac Gilla Mo-Cholmóg (FitzDermot or COLEMAN)
 Septs (finte): Ó Duibhghin (Dugan), Ó Tadhgain (TEAGAN, TEEGAN).
 Location - county, barony or townland: The land between the river Liffey and the 'Dublin' mountains.
 Cinéal (Kinship): Uí Dúnlainge

Uí Fáeláin 
 Clan name (Tuath): Uí Fáeláin
 Progenitor: Fáeláin m. Murchada m. Find m. Máel Mórda m. Muirecain m. Diarmata m. Rhuadri m. Fáeláin m. Murchada m. Bráen
 Hereditary Chief or Clan chief: Ó Broin (O'Byrne)
 Septs (finte): MacEochaidh (MacKeogh)
 Location - county, barony or townland: Crioch Bhranach, and included the barony of Newcastle with parts of the baronies of Ballinacor and Arklow.
 Cinéal (Kinship): Uí Dúnlainge

Uí Fiachrach Dynasty 
 Clan name (Tuath): Uí Fiachrach
 Progenitor: Fiachrae m. Eochaid Mugmedon m. Muiredach Tirech m. Fíacha Sroiptine m. Cairbre Lifechair m. Cormac mac Airt m. Art mac Cuinn m. Conn of the Hundred Battles m. Fedlimid Rechtmar m. Túathal Techtmar m. Fíachu Finnolach m. Feradach Finnfechtnach m. Crimthann Nia Náir m. Lugaid Riab nDerg m. The Findemna, et cetera
 Septs (finte): Uí Cleirigh (O'Cleary),  Ó Dubhda (Dowd), Ó hEidhin (Hynes), Ó Dubhda (Dowd), Uí Sheachnasaigh (O'Shaughnessy)
 Location Kingdom of Connacht

Uí Briúin Dynasty 
 Clan name (Tuath): Uí Briúin
 Progenitor: Brión m. Eochaid Mugmedon m. Muiredach Tirech m. Fíacha Sroiptine m. Cairbre Lifechair m. Cormac mac Airt m. Art mac Cuinn m. Conn of the Hundred Battles m. Fedlimid Rechtmar m. Túathal Techtmar m. Fíachu Finnolach m. Feradach Finnfechtnach m. Crimthann Nia Náir m. Lugaid Riab nDerg m. The Findemna, et cetera
 Septs (finte): Mac Brádaigh (Brady), Ó Conchubhair Donn (O'Conor), Uí Flaithbheartaigh (O'Flaherty), Uí Raghallaigh (O'Reilly), Uí Ruairc (O'Rourke)
 Location Kingdom of Connacht

Uí Fergusa 
 Clan name (Tuath): Uí Fergusa
 Progenitor: Fergus son of Dúnlang, son of Enna Nia, son of Bressal Bélach, son of Fiachu Baicced, son of Cathir Mor.
 Location - county, barony or townland: Their traditional territory immediately west of Dublin prior to the arrival of the Vikings, other sources give their territory between the river Liffey and Fir Cualand.
 Cinéal (Kinship): Uí Dúnlainge

Uí Máeli Tuile 
 Clan name (Tuath): Uí Máeli Tuile
 Progenitor: Fiachu Ba h-Aiccid, a son of Cathaír Már
 Hereditary Chief or Clan chief:
 Location - county, barony or townland:
 Cinéal (Kinship):  Dál Niad Cuirp

Uí nEirc (Ui Maic Eirce) 
 Clan name (Tuath): Uí nEirc (Ui Maic Eirce)
 Progenitor: Tuthal son of Muirithe, son of Maoltuile, son of Cuan, son of Conall, son of Grilline, son of Maoltuile son of Cuan, son of Conall, son of Grilline, son of Mac Eirc (a quo Ui Maic Eirce), son of Ailill Cennfada, son of Erc, son of Cairbre eabha, son of Brian, son of Fiacha Fidhgheinte (a quo Ui Fidhgeinte)
 Hereditary Chief or Clan chief: Ó Bruadar (BRODER, BRODERICK, BROTHERS)
 Septs (finte): Mac Braoin (BREEN, MacBREEN, BRUEN, BRUYN, BRYAN)
 Cinéal (Kinship): Osraighe
 Branches: Na Clanna (Mac Braoin)

Uí Bairrche 
 Clan name (Tuath): Uí Bairrche
 Progenitor: Dáire Barraig m. Cathaír Máir
 Hereditary Chief or Clan chief: Mac Gormáin (GORMAN)
 Septs (finte): Mic Raith (MacGRATH), Ó Tresaigh (TRACY, TRASSY, TRACIE), Ó Duibhin (Duffin)
 Location - county, barony or townland: Lord of Bargy at Slievemargy, Laois
 Cinéal (Kinship): Dál Niad Cuirp
 Branches:  Uí Bairrch Maige hAilbe (Carlow), Uí Bairrche of Mag Argetrois, Uí Bairrche Maige Indergraith (Uí Chritain) & Uí Bairrche Tíre (Uí Dimmatain), Uí Bairrche Magh dá chonn

Uí Bairrch Maige hAilbe 
 Clan name (Tuath): Uí Bairrch Maige hAilbe
 Progenitor: Mostly from Eochu Guinech ...Dáire Barraig m. Cathaír Máir
 Hereditary Chief or Clan chief:
 Septs (finte): Úi Briccne, Úi Cellaig, Úi Scatháin, Úi Cutlacháin, Úi Máeláin ("Mullen, Moylan, McMullen"), Úi Dobágu, Úi Fólachtáin, Úi Chommáin (Comane), Úi Gobbáin (Gowan), Úi Nárbotha, Síl Saichtha, Úi Canáin (Cannon?), Úi Conamla, Úi Crítáin, Úi Drescáin (or Úi Treascáin),Úi Émíne, Úi Pecclíne (Pelan ?), Úi Taidc (Teige), Úi Bóeth (see Úi Meic Barddíne), Úi Brandubáin (Braniff), Úi Brénaind (Brennan?), Úi Briúin ("Breen, Brown, Burns")
 Location - county, barony or townland: Baronies of Slievemargy in Co. Laois, parts of Idrone in Co. Carlow, and Kilkee and Moone in Co. Kildare)
 Cinéal (Kinship): Dál Niad Cuirp
 Branches: Úi Cellaig (Or Úi Ellaig)

Uí Bairrche Mag Argetrois 
 Clan name (Tuath): Uí Bairrche Mag Argetrois
 Progenitor: Dáire Barraig m. Cathaír Máir
 Location - county, barony or townland: The ancient name of Ballyragget in Kilkenny was Dún Tulach Uí mBairrche (Tullabarry/Tulacbarry)
 Cinéal (Kinship): Dál Niad Cuirp
 Branches: Clann Síláin (amongst the Osraighe)

Uí Bairrche Magh dá chonn 
 Clan name (Tuath): Uí Bairrche Magh dá chonn
 Progenitor: Dáire Barraig m. Cathaír Máir
 Hereditary Chief or Clan chief: Úi Fétháin
 Septs (finte): Ui Cearnaigh i Muigh Dha Chonn (O’Carny, O’Kearney)
 Location - county, barony or townland: Moyacom of East Carlow
 Cinéal (Kinship): Dál Niad Cuirp

Uí Bairrche Maige Dergráith 
 Clan name (Tuath): Uí Bairrche Maige Dergráith
 Progenitor: Dáire Barraig m. Cathaír Máir
 Septs (finte):  Úi Amsáin, Úi Crítáin, Úi Bodbáin, Úi Brócáin (O’Brogan), Úi Buidechair
 Location - county, barony or townland:
 Cinéal (Kinship):  Dál Niad Cuirp
 Branches: Síl Cillíne Scothbán

Uí Bairrche Tíre 
 Clan name (Tuath): Uí Bairrche Tíre
 Progenitor: Mostly from Féicc....Dáire Barraig m. Cathaír Máir
 Hereditary Chief or Clan chief: Uí Treasaigh
 Septs (finte): Úi Dímatáin, Úi Mincháin, Síl Rossa mc Muiredaig, Úi Senáin, Úi Móenaig (Mooney), Úi Rónáin (Ronane or Royane), Úi Cuilíne (Cullen) dia fail Diarmait Glinni Uissen, Síol Cumaine (Cummin), Úi Cutlacháin dia fail Diarmait Glinni Uissen, Úi Dobágu, Úi Móenacháin (Mangan), Ui Nialláin (Nealon)
 Location - county, barony or townland: The barony of Bargy
 Cinéal (Kinship): Dál Niad Cuirp

Uí Crimthainn Áin 
 Clan name (Tuath): Uí Crimthainn Áin
 Progenitor: Crimthaind Áin m. Cathaír Máir
 Hereditary Chief or Clan chief: O'Duff
 Location - county, barony or townland: Dún Masc (the rock of Dunamase)
 Cinéal (Kinship): Dál Niad Cuirp

Uí Failge 
 Clan name (Tuath): Uí Failge
 Progenitor: Donnchad mc Con Faifne m. Murchertaig m. Congalaig m. Duind Slébi m. Brógarbáin m. Conchobuir m. Find m. Máel Mórdae m. Conchobuir m. Flannacáin m. Cináeda m. Mugróin m. Óengussa m. Flaind m. Díumasaig m. Forannáin m. Congalaig m. Máel h-Umae m. Cathail m. Éogain Bruidne m. Nath Í m. Rossa Failgi m. Cathaír Máir.
 Hereditary Chief or Clan chief: Ua Conchobair Failghe (O'Connor Faly)
 Septs (finte): O Caomhanaigh, O Tuathalaigh, O Branaigh, Ó Braonáin (BRENNAN), O Duinn, O Diomasaigh, O Duibhidhir, muinntear Riain, Mac an Chrosain (MacCROSSAN), Ó hEimhin (HEAVEN EVANS, EVINS, HEAVAN), Ó hUidhrin (HEERIN, HEERAN, HEERANE, HEFFRON, HERANE, HEVERIN, HYRANE), Ó Reachtabra (RAFTER RAFFTER, RAFTERY, RAFTIS, RAGHTORE, WRAFTER), Ó Seabhlain (HEVLIN, SHOVELIN, TEVLIN), Mac Spealáin (SPILLANE, SMOLLEN, SPALANE, SPELLAN, SPELMAN), Ó hAimhergin (ERGIN, BERRIGAN, BERGAN, HAMERGIN), Ó Breacain (BRACKEN), Ó Conarain (CONDRON, CONDRAN, CONDRIN, CONERAN, CONORAN), MacConnla (CONLEY CONLY, CONNLA),
 Location - county, barony or townland: The territory of Ui Failghe or Ophaley comprised the following Baronies: Geshill in the King's Co.; Upper Philipstown and Lower Philipstown in the King's Co.; Warrenstown and Collestown in the same County; Ophaley or Offaley in the Co. of Kildare; Idough, Portnahinch and Tinahinch in the Queen's County.
 Cinéal (Kinship): Dál Niad Cuirp
 Branches: Uí Riagáin (O'Regan and O'Dunne), and the Clann Máellugra (O'Dempsey), Maigh Aoife, Uí Mealla, Clann Mugróin, Uí Bercháin, Uí Nialláin, Uí Berraide, Cenel Aitheamháin, Uí Flaind, Uí Chormaic, Uí Móenaig, Uí Berraidi, Uí Airmedaig, Uí Máele Topair, Uí Chuilíne, Uí Máel Aithgén, Uí Maine, Uí Onchon

Uí Riagáin 
 Clan name (Tuath): Uí Riagáin
 Progenitor: Cerball & Mac Tíre dá m. Con Bladma m. Con Allaid m. Fidallaid m. Duinn m. Duibgilla m. Máel Finne m. Riagáin m. Cináeda m. Mugróin m. Flaind.
 Hereditary Chief or Clan chief: Ó Riagain (O'Regan and O'Dunne)
 Location - county, barony or townland: The barony of Tinnahich, the most northern barony of Co Leix (Laois)
 Cinéal (Kinship): Uí Fáilghe

Ui Mealla 
 Clan name (Tuath): Ui Mealla
 Progenitor: Rosa Failgi m. Cathaír Máir.
 Hereditary Chief or Clan chief: Ó Finnthighearn (FINNERAN, FANARAN)
 Septs (finte): Mac an Bhaird (Ward)
 Location - county, barony or townland: Uisneach, now in Galway and Roscommon
 Cinéal (Kinship): Uí Failge

Uí Enechglaiss 
 Clan name (Tuath): Uí Enechglaiss
 Progenitor: Dúnlang m. Fiachrach m. Fínnsnechtae m. Cináeda m. Cathail m. Fiachrach m. Dúnchada m. Dúnlaing m. Dúngalaig m. Thuamín m. Máel Doborchon m. Dícolla m. Éogain [m. Beraig] m. Muiredaig m. Amalgada m. Nath Í m. Bressail Enechglais (a quo Uí Enechglais) m. Cathaír Máir.
 Hereditary Chief or Clan chief: Ua Fiachrach (O'Feary, FEERY, FEIGHRY, FEHERY, FEEREY, HUNT)
 Location - county, barony or townland: South of Arklow in County Wicklow
 Cinéal (Kinship): Dál Niad Cuirp
 Branches: Uí Inmiti, Uí Aithemon Mestige, Cenél Lugair Fatha h-uir dia tát Uí Cruchtáin, Síl Fuamnaige .i. Uí Toísecháin ó Druim Laígill: Síl Duib Damruis Uí Gobbáin & Uí Muirbetaig & Uí Dimbrogo Nuadat

Uí Drona 
 Clan name (Tuath): Uí Drona
 Progenitor: Labraid Laidech, son of Bressal Bélach, son of Fiachu Baicced, son of Cathair Mór
 Hereditary Chief or Clan chief: Ó Riain (RYAN, ROYNE, RYNE, RYANE)
 Septs (finte): Ó Domhnaill (DONNELL, DANIEL, DANIELS), Ó Dubhgilla (DOYLE DOWALL, DOWILLA, DOYAL), Ó hEideain (HAYDEN HAYDAN, HAYDON, HEADON, HEDANE, HEDIAN, HEYDON)
 Location - county, barony or townland: Baronies of Idrone East and West in county Carlow
 Cinéal (Kinship): Dál Niad Cuirp
 Branches: Ui Drona Laighin

Uí Cheithig a.k.a. Uí Ceataigh 
 Clan name (Tuath): Uí Cheithig a.k.a. Uí Ceataigh
 Progenitor: Cathair Mór's son Ailill Cétach (Céthech)
 Hereditary Chief or Clan chief: Ó Ceatfadha (KEATY, KEATHY)
 Location - county, barony or townland: Baronies of Ikeathy and Oughterany in northern Co. Kildare (Cenel n-Ucha and Uachtar Fine, respectively). Crích na Cétach: baronies of Warrenstown, co. Offaly and neighboring Upper Moyfenrath, co. Meath.
 Cinéal (Kinship): Dál Niad Cuirp
 Branches:  Cenél Ucha comprised the Uí Fithcellaigh, Uí Maili Derir, Uí Bóetain, Uí Broscai and Uí Folaing., Uí Mainchin of Tír Cenél nUcha, Ui Faebrannáin Uachtair Fine (of Ui Fine), Cilline mór, son of Coirpre, ancestor of the Ua Meimre and the Ui Foebraind of Uachtar Fine

Uí Dergmosaich h-ic Áth Chliath 
 Clan name (Tuath): Uí Dergmosaich h-ic Áth Chliath
 Progenitor: Dergmosach m. Cathaír Már
 Location - county, barony or townland: Áth Chliath
 Cinéal (Kinship): Dál Niad Cuirp

Uí Luascán 
 Clan name (Tuath): Uí Luascán
 Progenitor: Fergus Luascán m. Cathaír Már
 Cinéal (Kinship):  Dál Niad Cuirp

Uí Timmíne 
 Clan name (Tuath): Uí Timmíne
 Progenitor: Eochu Timmíne m. Cathaír Már
 Cinéal (Kinship): Dál Niad Cuirp
 Branches: Uí Báetáin, Uí Buide

Uí Máil 
 Clan name (Tuath): Uí Máil
 Progenitor: Maine Máil m. Feidelmid Fir Aurglais m. Corbmaic Gelta Gáeth m. Niad Cuirb (Nia Corb) m. Con Corb (Cu Chorb)
 Hereditary Chief or Clan chief: Uí Ceallaig Cuallan (O'Kelly of the Dublin/Wicklow hills)
 Septs (finte): Uí Theig or Ó Taidhg (O'Tighe),
 Location - county, barony or townland: The Glen of Imaal, Co. Wicklow
 Cinéal (Kinship): Dál Niad Cuirp

Uí Deaghaidh 
 Clan name (Tuath): Uí Deaghaidh
 Progenitor: Labraid Laidech, son of Bressal Bélach, son of Fiachu Baicced, son of Cathair Mór
 Hereditary Chief or Clan chief: Ó hAedha (Ó Hea,O'Hay or Hughes)
 Location - county, barony or townland: Limerick Hill (Luimnech) in north County Wexford, barony of Gorey
 Cinéal (Kinship): Dál Niad Cuirp
 Branches: Uí Dega Tamhnaige (of Dál Birn) of north Ossory and the Uí Dega Bic (desc. from Daig Bec m. Labrada) of Offaly

Uí Buide 
 Clan name (Tuath): Uí Buide
 Progenitor: Echthigern m. Donngusa m. Mencossaig m. Máelgairb m. h-Uargusa m. Buide (a quo Uí Buide) m. Laidcnén m. Cuimmíne m. Colmáin Elténe m. Blaithmeic m. Áeda Indén m. Cathbad m. Labrada m. Imchada m. Cormaic m. Con Corb.
 Hereditary Chief or Clan chief: Ó Caollaidhe (Queally, O'Kealy or O'Kelly)
 Location - county, barony or townland: Barony of Ballyadams, County Leix. East Kilkenny; and at Ballykealey, Carlow.
 Cinéal (Kinship): Dál Cormaic Luisc

Uí Labrada 
 Clan name (Tuath): Uí Labrada
 Progenitor: Sinchell m. Cenannáin m. Macha mc Cruaich m. Dulge m. Imchada m. Brolaich m. Lugdach m. Labrada m. Imchada m. Corbmaic m. Con Corb
 Septs (finte): Cuthraighe (Ui Cormaic Laighen)
 Cinéal (Kinship): Dál Cormaic Luisc
 Branches: Uí Labrada Cuthraige .i. Síl Fergusa Cuthig, Uí Chuircc, Uí Librén, Uí Ochrai

Uí Gabla 
 Clan name (Tuath): Uí Gabla
 Progenitor: Sinchell m. Cenannáin m. Macha mc Cruaich m. Dulge m. Imchada m. Brolaich m. Lugdach m. Labrada m. Imchada m. Corbmaic m. Con Corb
 Septs (finte): Cuthraighe? (Ui Cormaic Laighen)
 Location - county, barony or townland: Barony of North Salt in northern County Kildare & Roíriu (now Mullaghreelion) a few miles south of Athy in south Kildare, respectively
 Cinéal (Kinship): Dál Cormaic Luisc
 Branches: Uí Gabla Fine & Uí Gabla Roírenn

Uí Garrchon 
 Clan name (Tuath): Uí Garrchon
 Progenitor: Domnall m. Fergaile m. Flaithnia m. Máel Kalland m. Gormáin m. Fáebuirdatha m. Dúngaili m. Cethernaig m. Fáeburdatha m. Dúngaile m. Cethernaig m. Fáebuirdatha m. Marcáin m. Cillíne m. Rónáin m. Sinill m. Conaill m. Con Chongalt m. Finnchada m. Garrchon m. Fothaid m. n-Echach Lámdeirg m. Mesin Corb mc Con Corbb.
 Hereditary Chief or Clan chief: Ua Feghaile (O'Farrelly)
 Septs (finte): Ó Corra (CORR, CARRY, CARR), Ó Guaire (GORRY, GORY, GORE, GORRIE), Ó Lionnain (LENNON, LANNING, LEENAN, LENAN, LENANE, LENNANE),
 Location - county, barony or townland: Kings of Fortuath Laigin at Bray, Wicklow.
 Cinéal (Kinship): Dál Messin Corb (Ui Meisincorp)
 Branches: Ui Saráin (Chimbeada), Ui Brain Deilgine, Ui Cholmain Fordobuil

Uí Duach 
 Clan name (Tuath): Uí Duach
 Hereditary Chief or Clan chief:  Ó Braonain (BRENNAN, BRANNAN, BRANNON)
 Location - county, barony or townland: Airgetros in Maigib Raigne, Fassadinin, Idough barony, Kilkenny.
 Cinéal (Kinship): Uí Fáilghe
 Branches: Clann Amhlaibh (Clan Awly of Ui Duach), Clann mic Conill, Clann c. mhic Kelowe, alias Clann mhic Gillenanaomh & Clann Muirchertaigh

Ui Berchon (Ui Bearrchon) 
 Clan name (Tuath): Ui Berchon (Ui Bearrchon)
 Progenitor: Iachtchair, a descendant of Óengus Osrithe
 Hereditary Chief or Clan chief: Ó Callaidhe (O'Kelly, O'Kealy, O'Coely)
 Location - county, barony or townland: Old barony of Ibercon, forming the northern portion of the more modern barony of Ida (O'Donovan), in southeast Co. Kilkenny
 Cinéal (Kinship): Osraighe

Ui Cruinn (Uí Crinn, Uí Grine) 
 Clan name (Tuath): Ui Cruinn (Uí Crinn, Uí Grine)
 Location - county, barony or townland: Medieval 'barony' of Igrin [modern barony of Ida], in southeast Co. Kilkenny
 Cinéal (Kinship): Dál Chormaic

Uí Fairchelláin 
 Clan name (Tuath): Uí Fairchelláin
 Hereditary Chief or Clan chief: Ua hÚrachán (O'Horahan)
 Location - county, barony or townland: Parish of Offerlane, Co. Leix
 Cinéal (Kinship): Osraighe

Úi Scelláin 
 Clan name (Tuath): Úi Scelláin
 Progenitor: Scellan, who was sixth in descent from Óengus Osrithe
 Hereditary Chief or Clan chief: Ó Sceallain (SCALLEN, SKALLEN, SKELLAN, SKELTON)
 Location - county, barony or townland: Hui Scellain was in Sliabh Mairge, the mountain district which, extending into Kilkenny from Carlow and Queen's County, embraced the Castlewarren, Johnswell, and Kilmogar hills, in the north of the Barony of Gowran
 Cinéal (Kinship): Osraighe

Úi Geintich 
 Clan name (Tuath): Úi Geintich
 Hereditary Chief or Clan chief: Ua Donnachadha (Dunphy, O'Donochowe, O'Dunaghy, O'Donoghue, Donohoe, Donagh)
 Location - county, barony or townland: Ogenty [Ui-Geintigh, and Tir-Ua-nGentigh], Barony of Gowran, Co. Kilkenny.
 Cinéal (Kinship): Osraighe, [Mag Máil]

Ui Mic Uais Breagh a.k.a. Muintir Fhiodhbhuide 
 Clan name (Tuath): Ui Mic Uais Breagh a.k.a. Muintir Fhiodhbhuide
 Progenitor:
 Hereditary Chief or Clan chief: Mac Fhiodh bhuidhe (McEvoy)
 Septs (finte): Ó hIffernain (HEFFERNAN, HIFFERNANE)
 Location - county, barony or townland: Mountrath, Co. Laois
 Cinéal (Kinship): Laeghis
 Branches: Clan Crecain (Ó hIffernain)

Ui Meith Macha alias Ui-Meith Tire 
 Clan name (Tuath): Ui Meith Macha alias Ui-Meith Tire
 Progenitor: Imar m. Muircertaich m. Duibdarac m. Scannlain m. Indrachtaich m. Gairbid m. Ainbeith m. Mailbrigti m. Duibinnracht m. Taidg m. Innreachtaich m. Muiredaich m. Mailimuchair m. Scannlain m. Fingin m. Aedha m. Fiachrach m. Fiachrach m. Eogain m. Briuin m. Muiredaic Meith (a quo H. Meith) m. Imcadha m. Colla Da Crich m. Eachach Doimlen.
 Hereditary Chief or Clan chief: Ó hInnreachtaigh (O'Hanratty)
 Septs (finte): Ó hAinfeith (HANVEY, HANNAY, HANNEY), Ó Mael Brigdhe (MULREADY, MULBREEDY, MULBRIDE, MULREEDY, MURREADY, MULREDDY), Ó Gairbith (GARVEY), Ó hUarghuis (HORISH, HORISKY, HOURISKEY, WHORISKEY, WATERS, CALDWELL), Ó Beice (BECK, BEAKY, BAKEY), Ó Mearain (MARRON MARRAN, MARRANE, MARREN, MEARN), Ó Smollain (SMOLLEN, SMULLEN),
 Location - county, barony or townland: Barony of Monaghan, in the County of Monaghan
 Cinéal (Kinship): Síl Colla Focrích
 Branches: Ui-Seaain (Ó hAinfeith), Ui-Meath-Mara [Omeath]

Uí Briúin Archaille 
 Clan name (Tuath): Uí Briúin Archaille
 Progenitor: Brian son of Daig Duirn son of Rochaid son of Colla Fochríth
 Hereditary Chief or Clan chief: Ua Tuamain
 Septs (finte): Barony of Dungannon, co. Tyrone, which is located on the western side of Lough Neagh.
 Location - county, barony or townland: Co. Fermanagh
 Cinéal (Kinship): Síl Daim Argait (Uí Cremthainn)

Uí Labrada 
 Clan name (Tuath): Uí Labrada
 Location - county, barony or townland: Co. Fermanagh
 Cinéal (Kinship): Cenél Rochada

Uí Meic Brócc 
 Clan name (Tuath): Uí Meic Brócc
 Progenitor: Echdach Amainsen, son of Crimthann, son of Fiacc, son of Daig Duirn, son of Rochaid, son of Colla Fochríth
 Location - county, barony or townland: Co. Fermanagh
 Cinéal (Kinship): Cenél Rochada

Uí Echdach alias Ui Eachach Orior 
 Clan name (Tuath): Uí Echdach alias Ui Eachach Orior
 Progenitor: Murcad m. Ruaidri m. Muiredaich m. Ailella m. Cumascaigh m. Echadon m. Ruadacan m. Cellaich m. Ruadrach m. Conmaeil m. Airmedaich m. Feradaich m. Amalga m. Aililla m. Echach m. Feidlimthe m. Fiachrach m. Colla Da Crich.
 Hereditary Chief or Clan chief: Ó Ruadhacain (ROGAN, REDEGAN, ROHAGAN, ROOGAN, RODAGHAN)
 Septs (finte): Ó Domhnaill (DONNELL), Mag Labhradha (GLORY, GLORNEY, MAGLORY, MacGLORY, MacLAVERY, LAVERY, MacLOWRY), Ó hAileagain (HALLAHAN, HALLIGAN, HOLLEGANE, HOLLIGAN),
 Location - county, barony or townland: Northern Armagh
 Cinéal (Kinship): Airthir
 Branches: Síl Ciarain Ua nEchach, Clann-Ruadhagain

Uí Nialláin (Clan Cernaich) 
 Clan name (Tuath): Uí Nialláin (Clan Cernaich)
 Progenitor: Nialláin m. Féicc m. Feidelmid m. Fiachrach Cassáin m. Collai Fochríth.
 Hereditary Chief or Clan chief: Ua hAnluain (O'Hanlon)
 Septs (finte): ÓLorcain (LARKIN, LORKING, LORCAN, LORCAYNE, LURKAN, LURKAYNE), Ó hUidhrin (Herane), Ó hAedhagain (HEGAN EAKIN, EAKEN, HAGAN), Ó Muanain (MOYNAN MONAN, MONANE, MONAYNE, MONYNE, MOONAN, MOYNE), Mac Riabhaigh (MacREEVY MacCREVEY, MacGREEVEY), O Catharnaighe (Mac an tSionnaigh, anglicized MacTHENY, (FOX), Carney, TINNEY, MacASHEENY, MacATINNEY, ÓTINNEY, TINNY), Mac Gilla Fhiondain (MacALINDON), Ó Cearnaigh (CARNEY, CARNY), Mac Concaille (MacCONKEEL, MacENHILL, WOODS), Ó Foirredh (FUREY, FURY), Ó hEoir (HAIRE HAIR, HARE)
 Location - county, barony or townland: The baronies of Oneilland East and West in modern county Armagh. O'Catharnaighe, Sionnach, Fox, Teathba, Kilcoursey, Offaly.
 Cinéal (Kinship): Airthir

Uí Dorrthainn (alias Ui Dorthinn, Dorthaind, Dorethainn, Tortain) 
 Clan name (Tuath): Uí Dorrthainn (alias Ui Dorthinn, Dorthaind, Dorethainn, Tortain)
 Progenitor: Dorthon, son of Fiacc, son of Feideilmid, son of Fiachra Cassán, son of Colla Fochríth
 Hereditary Chief or Clan chief: Maelan Gae Mor
 Septs (finte): O'Maelan (MULLAN, MULLEN, MULLIN)
 Location - county, barony or townland: Brechmag, centered perhaps near Ardbraccan, 2 miles west of Navan, co. Meath
 Cinéal (Kinship): Airthir

Uí Tréna 
 Clan name (Tuath): Uí Tréna
 Progenitor: Trian son of Feidhlimidh, son of Fiachra Cassan, son of Colla Da Crich.
 Location - county, barony or townland:  Co. Armagh
 Cinéal (Kinship): Síl Fiachra Cassán
 Branches: Craebh Carthaind

Uí Eochada 
 Clan name (Tuath): Uí Eochada
 Progenitor: Fiachra Cassan, son of Colla Da Crich.
 Location - county, barony or townland: Co. Armagh
 Cinéal (Kinship): Síl Fiachra Cassán

Uí Cruind 
 Clan name (Tuath): Uí Cruind
 Progenitor: Fiachra Cassan, son of Colla Da Crich.
 Location - county, barony or townland: Co. Armagh
 Cinéal (Kinship): Síl Fiachra Cassán

Uí Maic Caírthinn alias Cenél Meic Cárthind 
 Clan name (Tuath): Uí Maic Caírthinn alias Cenél Meic Cárthind
 Progenitor: Cairthand (a quo H. Mc. Carthaind), son of Eichin, son of Bec (ri Airgiall) m. Cuanach m. mc. Dairi mc. Feidhlimidh mc. Echin mc. Fiacrach Tort mc. Echach mc. Colla Uais
 Hereditary Chief or Clan chief: Ó Cochlainn (COLGAN)
 Septs (finte): Ó Conghaile (Connell),Ó Cein (KEENE, KEEN, KAIN, KANE), Mac Giolla Michill (MacMEEL MacGILMIHILL, MacGILMICHILL, MITCHELL)
 Location - county, barony or townland: Lough Foyle, Tirkeeran, County Londonderry,
 Cinéal (Kinship): Uí Meic Uais, Síl Colla Uais
 Branches: Clan Conghail (Mac Giolla Michill)

Ui Tuirtre 
 Clan name (Tuath): Ui Tuirtre
 Progenitor: Floind (otait Ui Loind) m. Muiredaig m. Indrachtaigh m. Reachtabrat m. Mailcraibhi m. Mailfotartaigh m. Suibni m. Furodran m. Bece m. Cuanach m. Dairi m. Feidhlimthe m. Fechin m. Fiacrach Tuirtri m. Eachach m. Colla Uais.
 Hereditary Chief or Clan chief: Mac Fhloinn (O'Flynn or O'Lynn)
 Septs (finte): Ó Foirbhithe (FURPHY, FURFIE, FURPHEY, FURVEY), Ó hUid (HOOD HOUD, HUDE, MacHOOD, MAHOOD, ÓHOUD), Ó Maelruanaidh (MULROONEY, MULRONEY, MURRONY), Ó Domhnaillain (DONNELLAN, DONELAN),
 Location - county, barony or townland: West of Lough Neagh (in modern County Tyrone), as well as northwest of the great Lough in the modern barony of Loughinsholin, County Londonderry.
 Cinéal (Kinship): Uí Meic Uais, Síl Colla Uais

Uí Mac Uais Mide 
 Clan name (Tuath): Uí Mac Uais Mide
 Progenitor: Colla Uais.
 Hereditary Chief or Clan chief: Ua Comhraidhe (O'Curry)
 Location - county, barony or townland: Moygoish barony, co. Westmeath)
 Cinéal (Kinship): Uí Meic Uais, Síl Colla Uais

Uí Mac Uais Breg 
 Clan name (Tuath): Uí Mac Uais Breg
 Progenitor: Colla Uais.
 Hereditary Chief or Clan chief:  ÓhInnascaigh (Ennis)
 Septs (finte): Ó Minnegain (MINNEGAN, MINNICAN), Ó Cormaidhe (CORMIE CORMY, CORMEY, COOMIE, CUMEY), Ó Dubheoin (DEVINE, DEVANE, DEVIN),
 Location - county, barony or townland: Upper Kells/Lower Navan baronies, co. Meath
 Cinéal (Kinship): Uí Meic Uais, Síl Colla Uais

Uí Dáire 
 Clan name (Tuath): Uí Dáire
 Location - county, barony or townland:
 Cinéal (Kinship): Síl Colla Uais

Uí Cormaic 
 Clan name (Tuath): Uí Cormaic
 Progenitor: Brion, son of Echach, son of Colla Uais
 Cinéal (Kinship): Síl Colla Uais

Conmaicne Clans
The Conmaicne of Magh Réin.

Conmaicne Cuile Toladh 
 Clan name (Tuath): Conmaicne Cuile Toladh
 Progenitor: Findchóem (Traech mac Causcraid, or Fráech mac Cúscraigh) m. Cúmscrach (a.k.a. Cumascrach)
 Hereditary Chief or Clan chief: Ó Talcharain (TOLLERAN, TALLERAN, TALRAN, TOLRAN)
 Septs (finte): Ó Calarain (COLLERAN), Ó Morann (O'Moran), Ó Martain (Martin or Martins)
 Location - county, barony or townland: Kilmaine barony, County Mayo.
 Cinéal (Kinship): Conmaicne
 Branches: Síl Cárida, Cenél Enda

Conmaicne Mara 
 Clan name (Tuath): Conmaicne Mara
 Progenitor: Conmaic (a quo Conmaicne) m. Oirbsen Máir (a quo Loch n-Oirbsen)...ultimately Fergus mac Roich
 Hereditary Chief or Clan chief: Úa Cadhla (O'Queally or O'Kealy)
 Septs (finte): Mac Conghaile (Conneely, MacNeela), Ó Clochartaigh (Cloherty or Stone),Ó Dubháin (Devany), Mac Fualáin\Ó Cualáin (FOLAN, FOLAND, FOLANE).
 Location - county, barony or townland: Connemara in western Co. Galway.
 Cinéal (Kinship): Conmaicne

Conmaicne Críchi Meic Eircce 
 Clan name (Tuath): Conmaicne Críchi Meic Eircce
 Progenitor: Fraech, son of Cumscrach
 Hereditary Chief or Clan chief:
 Location - county, barony or townland: Kilconickny, Co. Galway
 Cinéal (Kinship): Conmaicne
 Branches: Cenél Lughna, Cenél cCais and Cenél Dubháin (Conmaicne Dúna Móir)

Conmaicne Mide la Cuirccne 
 Clan name (Tuath): Conmaicne Mide la Cuirccne
 Progenitor: Copchass, in descent from Conmac, son of Orbsen mor.
 Hereditary Chief or Clan chief:
 Location - county, barony or townland: Quirene, a former name of the barony of Kilkenny West, Co. Westmeath.
 Cinéal (Kinship): Conmaicne

Conmaicne Bec 
 Clan name (Tuath): Conmaicne Bec
 Progenitor: Conmaic (a quo Conmaicne) m. Oirbsen Máir (a quo Loch n-Oirbsen)...ultimately Fergus mac Roich
 Hereditary Chief or Clan chief: Ua Tolairg (O'Toler)
 Location - county, barony or townland: Quirene, Co. Westmeath
 Cinéal (Kinship): Conmaicne

Muintir Eolais 
 Clan name (Tuath): Muintir Eolais
 Progenitor: Finer, son of Cúmscrach (a.k.a. Cumascrach)
 Hereditary Chief or Clan chief: Mac Raghnaill, Mac Rannall (Reynolds or MacGrannell)
 Septs (finte): Ó Mughroin (MORAN, MORAINE, MORANE, MOREN, MORRIN, MORYNE), Mac Searraigh (HERRY, SHARRY, FOALEY)
 Location - county, barony or townland: Leitrim baronies of Mohill and Leitrim
 Cinéal (Kinship): Conmaicne of Magh Réin
 Branches: Tellach Brocáin (alias Tellach Cagáin), Tellach Cendetigh, Tellach Maelmartain, Tellach maelmuiri, Tellach n-Odrainn,

Tellach Cearbhallan 
 Clan name (Tuath): Tellach Cearbhallan
 Progenitor: Finer, son of Cúmscrach (a.k.a. Cumascrach)
 Hereditary Chief or Clan chief: Maoil Mhiadhaigh (Mulvey)
 Septs (finte): Ó Beigléighinn (BEGLIN, BEGLAN, BEGLAIN, BEGNAL, BEGLANE, BIGLANE, BEGLEN, BEGLLIN, BIGLAN, BEGLYN), Ó Bardain (BODEN), Ó hEolusa (Eolais), Ó Muiredaigh (MURRAY, MORIE, MORRA, MORRIE, MOREY, ÓMORY, MURRY, MURRIE), Ó Cuirnin, ollamh (CURNIN, CURNAN, CURNEN), Ó Maolghuala (MULHOOLY, HOOGHLEY, MULHOOGHLEY, MULOOLEY), Mac Mioluic (MULLOCK MacMEELICK, MacMOLEG, MOOLICK, MULLICKE, MULOCK).
 Location - county, barony or townland: Leitrim baronies of Mohill and Leitrim
 Cinéal (Kinship):  Muinter Eolais, Conmaicne of Magh Réin

Cenel Luachain 
 Clan name (Tuath): Cenel Luachain
 Progenitor: Luachan, son of Onchu, and 4th in descent from Cumscrach
 Hereditary Chief or Clan chief: Mag Dorchaidh or Mac Dorchaidhe (Mac Dorcy, Darcy, Dorcey, MacGourkey)
 Septs (finte): Ó Dunain (DOONAN DONAYNE, DONNAN, DOONANE, DOUNAN, DUNNAN, DYNAN), Ó Ciardubhain (KEARON, KERRANE, KERRIVANE, KERWAN, KIRRANE)
 Location - county, barony or townland: Oughteragh parish, barony of Carrigallen, southern co. Leitrim
 Cinéal (Kinship): Conmaicne of Magh Réin
 Branches: Ui Bathbairr, Ui Braici, Ui Buibhin, Ui Chailti, Ui Cianacáin, Ui Conbhuidhe, Ui Damaigh of Cenél Luachain, Ui Dimusaigh, Ui Dubháin (Inis Doiri Dubháin), Ui Erailb, Ui Eturrain, Ui Gabhadáin, Ui Maelpátraig, Ui Maelsuthain, Ui Muinecháin, Ui Tredmain, Tellach Tanaide, Tellach Cléirigh.

Clann Calbrainn 
 Clan name (Tuath): Clann Calbrainn
 Location - county, barony or townland: Co. Leitrim
 Cinéal (Kinship): Conmaicne of Magh Réin
 Branches: Clann Martain, Clann Maelduilighe, Clann Bradain, Clann Arcain and Tellach Uanan

Clann Faelgusa 
 Clan name (Tuath): Clann Faelgusa
 Location - county, barony or townland: Co. Leitrim
 Cinéal (Kinship): Conmaicne of Magh Réin
 Branches: Clann Corrdercain, Clann Gemáin, Clann Cathusaigh, Clann Dinnachain, Clann Birn, Clann Anairc, Ui Conbhuidhe, Ui Gellustain, Ui Riaglachain.

Clann Finoicci, or Sil Findellaig 
 Clan name (Tuath): Clann Finoicci, or Sil Findellaig
 Progenitor: Descendants of Finoicc, 2nd wife of Findellach, son of Neidhe, and 5th fr. Cumscrach
 Location - county, barony or townland: Co. Leitrim
 Cinéal (Kinship): Conmaicne of Magh Réin
 Branches: Clann Telline, Clann Cronan, Clann Ainnsin, Clann Chirdubhain, Clann Finn, Clann Ciaracan, Clann Ibill

Cenél Cromáin 
 Clan name (Tuath): Cenél Cromáin
 Location - county, barony or townland: Co. Leitrim
 Cinéal (Kinship): Conmaicne of Magh Réin

Clann Faelchon 
 Clan name (Tuath): Clann Faelchon
 Location - county, barony or townland: Co. Leitrim
 Cinéal (Kinship): Conmaicne of Magh Réin

Tellach Finnachan 
 Clan name (Tuath): Tellach Finnachan
 Location - county, barony or townland: Co. Leitrim
 Cinéal (Kinship): Conmaicne of Magh Réin

Síl Maelefithrig 
 Clan name (Tuath): Síl Maelefithrig
 Location - county, barony or townland: Co. Leitrim
 Cinéal (Kinship): Conmaicne of Magh Réin
 Branches: Clann Clothachtaigh and Clann Oirechtaigh

Clann Fermaighe 
 Clan name (Tuath): Clann Fermaighe
 Progenitor: Findellach, the son of Neidhe, and 5th in descent from Cumscrach
 Hereditary Chief or Clan chief: Mac Cogadhain or Mac Acadhain (Mac Cogan)
 Location - county, barony or townland: Glenfarne in the parish of Cloonclare in the baronies of Dromahaire and Rosclogher, Co. Leitrim.
 Cinéal (Kinship): Conmaicne of Magh Réin
 Branches: Clann Cellachain, Clann Maelsamhna, Clann Taebhachain, Clann Ubhan, Clann Lughann, and Clann Uanan

Muintir Geradháin 
 Clan name (Tuath): Muintir Geradháin
 Hereditary Chief or Clan chief: Mag Fhionnbhairr (Mac Ginver, Gaynor, or Finnevar)
 Location - county, barony or townland: Lough Gowna in Co. Longford
 Cinéal (Kinship): Conmaicne of Magh Réin
 Branches: Tellach Finnoigi, Tellach Gabhadháin.

Muintír Giollagáin 
 Clan name (Tuath): Muintír Giollagáin
 Progenitor: Race of Rudhraigh, that is, of the same stock as Mag Raghnaill of Muinter Eolais
 Hereditary Chief or Clan chief: O Cuinn (O'Quinn)
 Location - county, barony or townland: Teathbha, baronies of Moydow and Shrule Co. Westmeath
 Cinéal (Kinship): Conmaicne of Magh Réin
 Branches: Tellach Connucan, Tellach Gormghaili, Tellach Maoilchíaráin

Muintir Anghaile 
 Clan name (Tuath): Muintir Anghaile
 Hereditary Chief or Clan chief: Ua Fearghaile (O'Farrell)
 Septs (finte): Mac Gofraidh (MacSHAFFREY, GEOFFREY, JEFFRIES, SHEFFRY), Mac Concaille (MacCONCAILLE MacCONKEEL, MacENHILL, WOODS), Mac Conmhaic (CONNICK, CONNOCK, CONWICK), Mac Tadghan (KEEGAN KEAGHAN, KEAHAN, KEEHAN), Mac Cú Shléibhe (MacLEAVY MacALEAVY, MacCLEEVEY), Mac Murchadha (MacMORROW, MURROGH, MURROW, MORROGH, MORROW), Mac Seáin (MacSHANE, JOHNSON), Ó Súilleabháin (SULLAHAN SOOLAHAN, SULLEHAN, SULLIHAN), Ó Tormaigh (TORMEY, TARMEY, TORMAY).
 Location - county, barony or townland: Annually in county Longford
 Cinéal (Kinship): Conmaicne of Magh Réin
 Branches: Tellach Congaláin, Tellach Floinn

See also 
 List of Irish clans in Ulster
 Irish clans
 List of Scottish clans
 Scottish clan
 List of ancient Celtic peoples and tribes
 Celtic peoples

References 

 Ireland's History in Maps - Tuath and Territory Index
 Ireland's HIstory in Maps - the Northern Ui Neill
 Leabhar na nGenealach: The Great Book of Irish Genealogies. De Búrca Books, Dublin, 2004. Edited by Nollaig Ó Muraíle.
 T.H. Mullin and J.E. Mullin (1966). "The Ulster Clans", North-West Books
 Robert Bell (1988) . "The Book of Ulster Surnames", The Black Staff Press

Sources:
 Annals of the Four Masters
 History of Clan Fox
 History of Ireland

Irish clans
Clans
Irish